Ribeira do Paul is a seasonal stream that flows in the northeastern part of the island of Santo Antão in Cape Verde. The stream flows from southwest to northeast. The upper part of the valley belongs to Cova-Paul-Ribeira da Torre Natural Park.

The sources of the stream Ribeira do Paul are northeast of the Cova crater, near the settlement Cabo da Ribeira. It flows through a narrow and steep gorge, along the settlements Campo de Cão and Eito, and flows into the Atlantic Ocean at the town of Pombas. There is small-scale agriculture in the valley, producing sugar cane, coffee, yam, banana, papaya and mango.

See also
List of streams in Cape Verde

References

Paul
Paul, Cape Verde
Cova-Paul-Ribeira da Torre Natural Park
Geography of Santo Antão, Cape Verde